William Wirt Adams (1819–1888) was a banker, planter, state legislator, and a Brigadier General in the Confederate States Army.

Early life
Adams was born in Frankfort, Kentucky, to Anna Weisiger Adams and Judge George Adams (a personal friend to American statesman and orator Henry Clay). He was a brother of Daniel Weisiger Adams, another future Civil War general. In 1825 his family moved to and settled in Natchez, Mississippi. His father was a district court judge for the state of Mississippi from 1836 to 1839. William attended college at Bardstown College in Bardstown, Kentucky. Upon graduation in 1839, he enlisted as a private for the Republic of Texas under Edward Burleson, received a commission to adjutant of the regiment, and was involved in the Military campaign of northeast Texas against Native Americans settled there.

He returned to Mississippi where he married Sallie Huger Mayarant in 1850. There he pursued banking and agriculture in Jackson, Mississippi, and Vicksburg, Mississippi. From 1850 to 1861, he owned and operated a successful business and, from 1858 to 1860, he served two sessions in the Mississippi House of Representatives.

Confederate States Army service
In 1861, after Mississippi seceded from the Union, Adams was appointed commissioner from Mississippi to Louisiana. As such, he helped the latter to secede from the Union. In February of that year, the Confederate States of America formed in Montgomery, Alabama. President Jefferson Davis offered Adams a cabinet position there as Confederate Postmaster General, but he declined.

After settling his banking interests, he formed and enlisted the "Wirt Adams" Cavalry Regiment into the Confederate States Army at Memphis, Tennessee, in August 1861. Later, in September, his command was ordered to Columbus, Kentucky, and then, in October, to Headquarters, General Albert Sidney Johnston, Bowling Green, Kentucky. From there they fought a rear-guard action in the Confederate retreat from Kentucky to Nashville, Tennessee, and subsequently to Corinth, Mississippi. Later, at the Battle of Shiloh, they were positioned on the extreme right flank of the infantry and fought with it near the Tennessee River at Greer's Ford. Then they were on outpost duty during the Siege of Corinth. Later, four of the regiment's companies aggressively attacked and pursued Union Army elements for two miles, near Booneville, Mississippi.

As a colonel, Adams, alongside General Sterling Price, later combined his regiment with an Arkansas regiment under Colonel William F. Slemons at Iuka, Mississippi. Upon leaving General Price, Adams captured a trainload of Union Army troops from Corinth. His orders next took him to Washington County, Mississippi. There he guarded local plantations and observed troop movements in and around Vicksburg, Mississippi. After the fall of Vicksburg, both his regiment and the 28th Mississippi Cavalry harassed and skirmished units under General William Tecumseh Sherman who were advancing on Confederate-held positions.

Commissioned as brigadier general in September 1863, Adams was assigned command of a brigade composed of both his regiment and the command of Colonel Logan. In February 1864, he was ordered to attack General Sherman's advance on Meridian, Mississippi. Near the end of the war, he operated alongside General Nathan Bedford Forrest in Alabama. He and his brigade surrendered near Ramsey Station, Sumter County, Alabama, on May 4, 1865. His farewell address was delivered to his command two days later. His parole is dated Gainesville, Alabama, May 12, 1865.

Later life and death

Upon the conclusion of the Civil War, Adams resided in Vicksburg and Jackson, Mississippi. In 1880, he was appointed as a Mississippi state revenue agent. He resigned in 1885 and took the position of postmaster in Jackson by appointment of President Grover Cleveland.

In 1888, Adams was made the target of a number of attacks by the editor of the New Mississippian, John H. Martin, a staunch prohibitionist and reform advocate. Adams was rebuked by Martin for, among other things, his role as a character witness in the murder trial of Colonel Jones S. Hamilton, who was ultimately acquitted for killing Roderick D. Gambrell, another newspaper editor and ally of Martin's, in a street duel. On May 1, 1888, Adams, walking on President Street in Jackson with another man, encountered Martin coming from the opposite direction near the corner of Amite Street. After a brief verbal altercation, both men pulled revolvers on each other, Adams firing three times and Martin six. Both died almost immediately with Adams shot through the heart and Martin in the chest, leg, and hand. He was buried in Greenwood Cemetery in Jackson.

Photograph

The Photograph of William Wirt Adams in Era Warner's "Generals in Gray" is incorrect-it is that of his brother Daniel Weisiger Adams.

See also

 List of American Civil War generals (Confederate)
 Vicksburg order of battle

References

Further reading
 
 Johnson, Allen, ed.  Dictionary of American Biography.  New York:Charles Scribner's Sons, 1936.

External links
 

1819 births
1888 deaths
19th-century American politicians
Mississippi postmasters
Confederate States Army brigadier generals
Deaths by firearm in Mississippi
Democratic Party members of the Mississippi House of Representatives
People of Mississippi in the American Civil War
People of the Texas Revolution
Politicians from Frankfort, Kentucky
People from Natchez, Mississippi
American slave owners